The 1972 Tour de France was the 59th edition of the Tour de France, one of cycling's Grand Tours. The long-awaited clash between Eddy Merckx and Luis Ocaña after Ocaña crashed on Col de Menté in the 1971 Tour de France. After riding strongly in the first two weeks of the race and being the closest GC contender to Merckx, Luis Ocaña crashed once more, in the Pyrenees, leaving Merckx to battle Cyrille Guimard for the win. Guimard, having won four stages, had to leave the race after stage 17 in second place (he already was 7:58 behind at that point), but was given the combativity award after the race.

Teams

The 1972 Tour started with 12 teams, each with 11 cyclists, a total of 132.

The teams entering the race were:

 
 
 
 
 Van Cauter–Magniflex–de Gribaldy

Pre-race favourites

In the previous year, Luis Ocaña was on his way to beat Eddy Merckx, when he fell as leader and had to give up. Everybody expected Merckx and Ocana to battle for the victory in 1972. Ocana felt that he could have won the 1971 Tour, and Merckx did not like the comments that he did not deserve the 1971 victory, and both wanted to show their strengths. Merckx had won important races before the Tour started, including the 1972 Giro d'Italia, and was also the reigning world champion. Ocana had won less races, but won the Criterium du Dauphiné Libéré. The most important other participants were considered Raymond Poulidor, Felice Gimondi, Joop Zoetemelk and Bernard Thévenet.

José Manuel Fuente, who had won the 1972 Vuelta a España and finished second in the 1972 Giro d'Italia, did not compete, as his team decided they had already been in too many hard races. Herman Van Springel had announced four days prior to the Tour that he would leave his team after his contract would end at the end of 1972. His team then removed him from the Tour squad.

Route and stages
For the first time since 1947, the Tour de France was entirely in France.

Three days before the Tour started on 1 July, the schedule was changed: the final time trial was split, with the first 42 km as a time trial in the morning, and the last 89 km as a mass-start stage in the afternoon. There were two rest days, in Bayonne and Orcières.

Race overview

Merckx won the prologue, beating his rivals by some seconds. In the first stage, Cyrille Guimard won the sprint, and because of the bonification seconds took over the leader's jersey in the general classification. In the next stages, Merckx tried to win back time by winning bonification seconds in intermediate sprints and at the finish, but Guimard used the same tactic. Merckx won back the first position thanks to the bonification seconds after the team time trial in stage 3b, but lost it again in the fourth stage.
Merckx won the time trial in the second part of the fifth stage, but Guimard came third, retaining the lead. After the sixth stage, Guimard was 11 seconds ahead of Merckx. The third place was occupied by a teammate of Merckx, and Ocaña was in fourth place, one minute behind Guimard.

In the seventh stage, the Tour reached the Pyrenees. Ocaña attacked two times, and the second time only Merckx could follow. When Ocaña punctured, and later crashed with Thevenet, Merckx was away without him. Another group, including Zoetemelk and Guimard, had reached Merckx, and crossed the finish line together. Ocana finished in sixth place, losing 1 minute and 49 seconds. Thevenet lost more than six minutes that stage, and lost all hope of winning. He was taken to the hospital to see if the crash had caused serious injuries, but could start the next stage. In the eighth stage, Lucien Van Impe attacked on the last climb. Merckx caught him and won the stage, with Ocana only eight seconds behind him. Guimard lost three minutes, and Merckx overtook him in the general classification. In the ninth stage, Roger Pingeon left the race. He did not play an important role in the general classification, but his team expected him to help his teammate Thevenet in the rest of the race.

The eleventh stage ended with the climb up to Mont Ventoux. After Merckx' team had pushed the pace such that most cyclists in the peloton had dropped, Ocana attacked four times. Every time, Merckx was able to chase him, together with only Poulidor. Poulidor then attacked, but could not get away. Some other cyclists were able to get back, including Thevenet. Thevenet then attacked, and left the others behind, winning the stage.

Merckx expected Ocana to attack in the twelfth stage, so he stayed with him. When Joaquim Agostinho and Lucien Van Impe attacked, Merckx let them go and stayed with Ocana, as Merckx only cared about Ocana; he did not want Ocana to win back time, and did not want him to win the stage which could give him inspiration in the next stages. On the thirteenth stage, Merckx' team first set a pace that eliminated all but 16 cyclists at the start of the climb of the Vars. Raymond Delisle escaped from that group, but Merckx and Agostinho chased and passed him after the summit. On the way down, Guimard was able to catch Merckx, who had dropped Delisle and Agostinho. Climbing the Izoard, Merckx dropped Guimard, and soloed to the victory. By then, Merckx was leading the general classification firmly, almost five minutes ahead of Ocana.

The first part of the fourteenth stage was also won by Merckx, who outsprinted Zoetemelk. Ocana lost two minutes, and Guimard overtook him in the general classification.
In the second part of the fourteenth stage, Ocana lost more than five minutes. Guimard and Merckx sprinted for the stage victory, and the photo finish gave the victory to Guimard. Ocana left the race after that stage; he had contracted a lung infection after his fall in the seventh stage. The stage ended with two laps of 1800 m; when it was found out that one group had missed one lap, the rules said that this group would have to ride that lap again, but the jury decided to use the times clocked after the first lap.

The fifteenth stage was also narrowly won by Guimard; Merckx had already raised one hand to cheer. In the seventeenth stage, Guimard struggled with his health. He needed medical attention during the entire stage, and lost two minutes on the final climb. After 10 km in the eighteenth stage, he left the race.

Merckx was now leading by more than ten minutes, and was certain to win the race. The second place was still not certain; Poulidor and Gimondi were separated only by one second. In the time trial on the last day, won by Merckx, the decision fell: Gimondi came in second, Poulidor fourth, and Gimondi overtook Poulidor in the general classification. After the finish in Paris, Merckx gave the green jersey that he received for winning the points classification to Guimard, who otherwise would have been the winner of that classification.

Doping
Guimard had been treated by Bernard Sainz. After Guimard left the race, there were rumours that Guimard had been using doping in the last days of the Tour; to end these rumours, he requested that after the eighteenth stage, he would also be checked for doping.

In 2000, Sainz wrote the book "The stunning revelation of Dr. Mabuse", where he denied that he was responsible.

Later that year, Eddy Merckx finished second in the athlete of the year poll, behind Mark Spitz.

Classification leadership and minor prizes

There were several classifications in the 1972 Tour de France, three of them awarding jerseys to their leaders. The most important was the general classification, calculated by adding each cyclist's finishing times on each stage. The cyclist with the least accumulated time was the race leader, identified by the yellow jersey; the winner of this classification is considered the winner of the Tour.

Additionally, there was a points classification, where cyclists got points for finishing among the best in a stage finish, or in intermediate sprints. The cyclist with the most points lead the classification, and was identified with a green jersey.

There was also a mountains classification. The organisation had categorised some climbs as either first, second, third, or fourth-category; points for this classification were won by the first cyclists that reached the top of these climbs first, with more points available for the higher-categorised climbs. The cyclist with the most points lead the classification, but was not identified with a jersey in 1972.

Another classification was the combination classification. This classification was calculated as a combination of the other classifications, its leader wore the white jersey.

The fifth individual classification was the intermediate sprints classification. This classification had similar rules as the points classification, but only points were awarded on intermediate sprints. In 1972, this classification had no associated jersey.

For the team classification, the times of the best three cyclists per team on each stage were added; the leading team was the team with the lowest total time. The riders in the team that led this classification wore yellow caps.

In addition, there was a combativity award, in which a jury composed of journalists gave points after mass-start stages to the cyclist they considered most combative. The split stages each had a combined winner. At the conclusion of the Tour, Cyrille Guimard won the overall super-combativity award, also decided by journalists. Three further daily individual awards were given for good humour, teamwork and elegance. Overall awards were given for these also, with Bernard Thévenet seen as the funniest, Martin Van Den Bossche the best teammate and Felice Gimondi the most elegant. The Souvenir Henri Desgrange was given to the first rider to pass the memorial to Tour founder Henri Desgrange near the summit of the Col du Galibier on stage 14a. This prize was won by Joop Zoetemelk.

Final standings

General classification

Points classification

Mountains classification

Combination classification

Intermediate sprints classification

Team classification

Notes

References

Bibliography

External links

 
T
T
1972
July 1972 sports events in Europe
1972 Super Prestige Pernod